The Attawapiskat Formation is a geologic formation in Ontario. It preserves fossils dating back to the Silurian period.

Location
The Attawapiskat Formation encompasses a large portion of the Hudson Bay Basin. The formation remains visible from northern Ontario. A small portion of the formation does extend onto Nunavut territory.

Composition
It is widely believed that the formation originally deposited on a shallow rimmed shelf, followed by the development of barrier reefs into an nonlinear and uncoordinated "belt" around the Hudson Basin. Within the Hudson Bay Lowlands, the formation consists of dolomite and limestone rich in both coral and sponge. The formation is a haven for lithotopes, or media for sediments to deposit, with various types including:
 Mottled to Nodular Skeletal Wackestone
 Stromatoporoid-Coral Framestone
 Pelodial Intraclastic Bindstone
 Graded Oolitic Grainstone
The formation's depth reaches 62 meters at its deepest.

Fossil content

See also

 List of fossiliferous stratigraphic units in Ontario

References

 
 Ramdoyal, A., Nicolas, M.P.B. and Chow, N. 2013: Lithofacies analysis of the Silurian Attawapiskat Formation in the Hudson Bay Lowland, northeastern Manitoba; in Report of Activities 2013, Manitoba Mineral Resources, Manitoba Geological Survey, p. 144–155.
 Gass, Kenneth & Mikulic, Donald. (2011). Observations on the Attawapiskat Formation (Silurian) trilobites of Ontario, with description of a new encrinurine. Canadian Journal of Earth Sciences. 19. 589–596. 10.1139/e82-047.

Silurian Ontario
Silurian southern paleotropical deposits